Kim Dong-moon (Hangul: 김동문, Hanja: 金東文; born 22 September 1975) is a retired South Korean badminton player who won major titles between the mid-1990s and the mid-2000s (decade), and widely regarded as one of finest men's doubles and mixed doubles players in badminton history. Kim captured the world attention when he unexpectedly winning the gold medal in the mixed doubles event with Gil Young-ah at the 1996 Atlanta Summer Olympics. On his path to greatness, he won gold medals both in men's and mixed doubles at the 1999 World Championships. Kim and Ra Kyung-min, partnered up to become one of the strongest mixed doubles pairings of that time. They did not drop a single match from April to November in 2003. They won 10 straight victorious tournaments: 9 consecutive Grand Prix events and one World Championship title. Their excellent results in 2003 earned Kim and Ra the Eddie Choong Player of the Year award. He captured this award previously by himself in 2002. Despite their domination, the golden couple crashed in the second round against the Danish partnership of Jonas Rasmussen and Rikke Olsen at the 2004 Athens Olympics. Kim however redeemed himself with a gold medal in men's doubles with Ha Tae-kwon. After the 2004 Olympics, Kim retired from playing and married his former mixed doubles partner, Ra in 2005. Kim is currently the only South Korean player to have ever won Olympic gold in both the men's and mixed doubles events. He was inducted into the BWF Hall of Fame in 2009.

Career

1996 Summer Olympics
Kim competed for Korea in badminton at the 1996 Summer Olympics in mixed doubles with partner Gil Young-ah.  In the final, they rallied to upset their fellow Koreans Park Joo-bong and Ra Kyung-min 13-15, 15-4, 15-12 to win the gold medal.

Kim also competed in men's doubles with partner Yoo Yong-sung, but was surprisingly eliminated by Michael Søgaard & Henrik Svarrer of Denmark 15-11, 5-15, 18-15 in the first round of the event.

2004 Summer Olympics
Kim competed for Korea in badminton at the 2004 Summer Olympics in men's doubles with partner Ha Tae-kwon.  They had a bye in the first round and defeated Robert Mateusiak and Michał Łogosz of Poland in the second.  In the quarterfinals, Kim and Ha beat Zheng Bo and Sang Yang of China 15-7, 15-11.  They won the semifinal against Eng Hian and Flandy Limpele of Indonesia 15-8, 15-2 and defeated fellow Koreans Lee Dong-soo and Yoo Yong-sung 15-11, 15-4 to win the gold medal.

Kim also competed in mixed doubles with partner Ra Kyung-min.  They had a bye in the first round and defeated Chris Bruil and Lotte Bruil of the Netherlands in the second.  In the quarterfinals, Kim and Ra lost to Jonas Rasmussen and Rikke Olsen of Denmark 17-14, 15-8.

Personal life
Kim is married to his former mixed doubles partner Ra Kyung-min, and in July 2007 they had a son named Han-wool. Kim currently resides in Calgary, Alberta, Canada.

Achievements

Olympic Games 
Men's doubles

Mixed doubles

World Championships 
Men's doubles

Mixed doubles

World Cup 
Mixed doubles

Asian Games 
Mixed doubles

Asian Championships 
Men's doubles

Mixed doubles

Asian Cup 
Men's doubles

Mixed doubles

World Junior Championships 
Boys' doubles

Mixed doubles

IBF World Grand Prix (59 titles, 9 runners-up)
The World Badminton Grand Prix sanctioned by International Badminton Federation (IBF) since 1983.

Men's doubles

Mixed doubles

IBF International (2 titles)
Men's doubles

References

External links
 
 

1975 births
Living people
Sportspeople from South Jeolla Province
South Korean male badminton players
Badminton players at the 1996 Summer Olympics
Badminton players at the 2000 Summer Olympics
Badminton players at the 2004 Summer Olympics
Olympic badminton players of South Korea
Olympic gold medalists for South Korea
Olympic bronze medalists for South Korea
Olympic medalists in badminton
Medalists at the 2004 Summer Olympics
Medalists at the 2000 Summer Olympics
Medalists at the 1996 Summer Olympics
Badminton players at the 1998 Asian Games
Badminton players at the 2002 Asian Games
Asian Games gold medalists for South Korea
Asian Games bronze medalists for South Korea
Asian Games medalists in badminton
Medalists at the 1998 Asian Games
Medalists at the 2002 Asian Games
World No. 1 badminton players
Badminton coaches